Puresh was a Moksha Kanazor, ruler of Kingdom Moxel in (Middle Volga) mentioned in Russians sources as Murunza. He was an ally of Russian Grand Prince Yuri II of Vladimir and of the Cuman Khan Köten against the Volga Bulgars and Erzyas in the 1230s.

War For Kadoma

European Campaign 
In September 1237 the Mongols invaded Moksha kingdom Moxel). Puresh became a vassal of Batu Khan and joined Mongol army in the European campaign. Puresh's warriors became the vanguard of the Mongol army and took part in the seizure of Kiev, Sandomierz and Zawichost.

Massacre before Battle of Legnica 
Puresh secretly met with the High Duke of Poland, Henry II the Pious, on 8 April 1241, one day before the Battle of Legnica, and they agreed that the Moksha army would join the Silesia and Greater Poland. Subutai uncovered the plot and Puresh, his son Atämaz and many Moksha warriors were killed while sleeping after midnight on 9 April 1241.

Aftermath
Queen Narchat took a revenge on Mongols in 1242 and raided their convoys in Mokshaland. It led to an uprising which resulted in another war with Mongols returned from Europe known as Sernya battle. William of Rubruck described Mokshaland after the war as a land without cities with people dwell in forests since "their king and most of his men were killed in Germany where they were forced to go together with the Mongols".

See also
 Mokshas
 Yuri II of Vladimir
 Köten
 Henry II the Pious
 Battle of Legnica
 Mongol invasion of Rus'
 Mongol invasion of Europe
 History of Mokshaland
 History of Middle Volga Area

Literature 
 Based on British Library MS Royal 14.C.XIII Fol. 225r-236r and thus ends prematurely.
 Opus Majus, Volume I in the Internet Archive – original text in Latin (including Part IV), ed. by John Henry Bridges, 1900.

Notes

12th-century births
1241 deaths
Assassinated people
13th-century soldiers
Military strategists
13th-century rulers in Europe
13th-century monarchs in Europe
People murdered in Poland
Moksha people